On November 6, 1990, the District of Columbia held an election for its non-voting House delegate representing the District of Columbia's at-large congressional district. Incumbent Walter E. Fauntroy (D) had stepped down earlier to run for Mayor of Washington, D.C.  Eleanor Holmes Norton (D) won the open seat. All elected members would serve in 102nd United States Congress.

The delegate is elected for two-year terms.

Candidates 
Eleanor Holmes Norton, a Democrat, sought election for her first term to the United States House of Representatives. Norton was opposed in this election by Republican challenger Harry M. Singleton and independent candidate George X. Cure, who received 26.31% and 5.11%, respectively.  Singleton's performance was the strongest of any Republican candidate for this office so far. This resulted in Norton being elected with 61.67% of the vote.

Results

See also
 United States House of Representatives elections in the District of Columbia

References 

United States House
District of Columbia
1990